Luigi Miletta (born 9 August 1988) is an former Italian racing cyclist. He rode at the 2013 UCI Road World Championships in Florence.

Major results
2010
 1st Giro del Medio Brenta
 8th Trofeo Città di San Vendemiano
2011
 7th Piccolo Giro di Lombardia
 7th Trofeo Edil C
 9th Ruota d'Oro
 10th Chrono Champenois
 10th Coppa della Pace
2012
 1st Trofeo Internazionale Bastianelli
 9th Coppa della Pace

References

External links
 

1988 births
Living people
Italian male cyclists
Sportspeople from Pisa
Cyclists from Tuscany
21st-century Italian people